The Nakha were an Arab tribe of Yemen. It is a branch of the much larger Madhhij tribe. They have converted to Islam by Muadh ibn Jabal During the 7th century, they participated in the Islamic conquests. The tribe has notable historical figures such as Malik ibn al-Harith, Alqama ibn Qays and al-Nakhai.

Al-Hamdani had mentioned the Nukha tribe in his book Sifat Jazirat al Arab (Description of the Arabian Peninsula) (900 AD).

References

Tribes of Arabia
Yemeni tribes
Semitic-speaking peoples
Qahtanites